Narpati Singh was the zamindar of Hardoi, Uttar Pradesh, India.

War with the British 

[He is from Madhoganj District Hardoi which is about two kilometres away from Ruia Garhi. At the time of the fight for freedom in India, Ruia Garhi was the princess and her father Narpati Singh was the king. After most areas of Awadh were captured by the British, the British Army became in charge of Hardoi too. But soon, due to the bravery and courage of Narpat Singh, the British faced defeat. Narpati Singh was a strategic planner and due to this, Hardoi once again came to under Narpati Singh.

But the British were not satisfied after losing the battle, therefore, in the fifth battle, the British army decided to fight in large number and even used cannon. Even in this battle, Narpati Singh and Ruia Garhi did not back down and arranged soldiers for the battle. But since the Britishers had advanced modern weaponry and a large number of soldiers, they were able to defeat Narpat Singh and Ruia Garhi. Soon, Hardoi came under the control of the Britishers.

References 

Year of birth missing
Year of death missing
Revolutionaries of the Indian Rebellion of 1857
Indian monarchs